The 1963 Coupe de France Final was a football match held at Parc des Princes, Paris, between AS Monaco FC and Olympique Lyonnais. After a goalless draw in the first match on 12 May 1963, Monaco won 2–0 in the replay on 23 May.

Match details

First match

Replay

See also
1962–63 Coupe de France

External links
Coupe de France results at Rec.Sport.Soccer Statistics Foundation
Report on French federation site

Coupe De France Final
1963
Coupe De France Final 1963
Coupe De France Final 1963
Sport in Hauts-de-Seine
May 1963 sports events in Europe
1963 in Paris